Irene Kataq Angutitok (1914 – 1971) was an Inuit sculptor. Her name also appears as Katak Angutitaq.

Background 

She was born Irene Kataq in Bathurst Inlet, Nunavut. She married Athanasie Angutitaq in 1929; the couple lived in Naujaat. Angutitok used soapstone, ivory and whalebone in her art. Some of her sculptures portray scenes from the Bible; she was encouraged by Father Bernie Franzen. She also created sculptures of female figures.

She died in Naujaat in 1971.

In 2002, Canada Post created a Christmas stamp based on her sculpture Mary and Child.

Her works are included in the collections of the National Gallery of Canada, the Metropolitan Museum of Art and the Winnipeg Art Gallery.

List of Exhibitions 

 Spoken in Stone: an exhibition of Inuit Art (Whyte Museum of the Canadian Rockies)
 The Bessie Busman Collection (Winnipeg Art Gallery)
 Repulse Bay (Winnipeg Art Gallery)
 The Swinton Collection of Inuit Art (Winnipeg Art Gallery)
 Sculpture/Inuit: Masterworks of the Canadian Arctic (Canadian Eskimo Arts Council and Vancouver Art Gallery)
 The Jacqui and Morris Shumiatcher Collection of Inuit Art (Norman Mackenzie Art Gallery, University of Regina)
 The Abbott Collection of Inuit Art (Winnipeg Art Gallery)
 Eskimo Sculpture (Winnipeg Art Gallery presented at the Manitoba Legislative Building)
 Uumajut: Animal Imagery in Inuit Art (Winnipeg Art Gallery)
 Images of the Far North (Studio Art Gallery, State University of New York)

References 

1914 births
1971 deaths
Inuit sculptors
Canadian women sculptors
20th-century Canadian sculptors
20th-century Canadian women artists
Artists from Nunavut
People from Kitikmeot Region
Canadian Inuit women
Inuit from the Northwest Territories
People from Naujaat